The Tamborasi River is a river in Tamborasi, Kolaka, Southeast Sulawesi, Indonesia. It is located approximately 70km (43 miles) north of the city of Kolaka.  With a length of 20m and an approximate width of 15m, it is sometimes claimed to be the world's shortest river. It empties into the Flores Sea.

References

Rivers of Sulawesi
Rivers of Indonesia